{{DISPLAYTITLE:C20H17NO6}}
The molecular formula C20H17NO6 (molar mass: 367.35 g/mol, exact mass: 367.1056 u) may refer to:

 Bicuculline
 Sibiricine